Joona Veteli (born 21 April 1995) is a Finnish football player who plays for Finnish side KuPS. Veteli plays in the position of centre midfielder but can also operate as an attacking midfielder, defensive midfielder, right-back and winger.

Club career
On 9 November 2021, he joined KuPS on a two-year contract.

References
  Profile at ffjaro.fi
  

1995 births
Living people
Finnish footballers
Finland under-21 international footballers
Finland youth international footballers
Veikkausliiga players
Finnish expatriate footballers
Expatriate footballers in Norway
Finnish expatriate sportspeople in Norway
Fredrikstad FK players
Norwegian First Division players
TP-47 players
FC Ilves players
Kuopion Palloseura players
Association football midfielders
People from Kemi
Sportspeople from Lapland (Finland)